Evan Rodrigues (born July 28, 1993) is a Canadian professional ice hockey centre/winger currently playing for the Colorado Avalanche of the National Hockey League (NHL). He previously played for the Buffalo Sabres and Pittsburgh Penguins.

Playing career

Junior
Rodrigues played two seasons for the Georgetown Raiders of the Ontario Junior Hockey League (OJHL). He scored 105 points (41 goals, 64 assists) in 94 contests during the two seasons, and led his team to the playoffs in both seasons to advance to the 2010–2011 league semifinals. Rodrigues was named to the Team Canada East and earned All-Star Honours after scoring seven points (3 goals, 4 assists).

College
Rodrigues attended Boston University, where he played four seasons (2011–2015) with the Boston University Terriers men's ice hockey team, which competes in the NCAA Men's Division I Hockey East conference. A two time Hockey East Second-Team All-Star, Rodrigues tallied 121 points (42 goals, 79 assists) in 146 contests throughout his career as a BU Terrier. During his senior year, Rodrigues finished second in the nation in scoring with 61 points and was named Hockey East Player of the Month in both January and April 2015. Rodrigues was second only to teammate Jack Eichel.

Professional
On April 22, 2015, Rodrigues agreed to a two-way, entry-level contract with the Buffalo Sabres. He played most of the season with the Rochester Americans of the American Hockey League before receiving his first NHL call-up and playing his first game on April 8, 2016. He scored his first NHL goal and first NHL assist the following night in a game against the New York Islanders.

On July 27, 2017, the Sabres re-signed Rodrigues to a two-year, $1.3 million contract worth $650,000 annually.

Rodrigues joined the Sabres full-time during the 2018–19 season. In 74 games, he recorded nine goals and 20 assists.

On July 25, 2019, the Sabres re-signed Rodrigues to a one-year, $2 million contract extension. In the following 2019–20 season, Rodrigues struggled to replicate his previous offensive totals with the Sabres, posting just 5 goals and 9 points through 38 games. At the trade deadline, Rodrigues was dealt by the Sabres, along with Conor Sheary to the Pittsburgh Penguins in exchange for Dominik Kahun on February 24, 2020.

On August 25, 2020, Rodrigues was traded by the Penguins to the Toronto Maple Leafs along with David Warsofsky, Filip Hållander and the 15th overall pick in the 2020 NHL Entry Draft in exchange for Kasperi Kapanen, Jesper Lindgren and Pontus Åberg. However, on October 9, 2020, unable to come to terms with Maple Leafs and having not received a qualifying offer, Rodrigues returned to Pittsburgh as a free agent on a one-year, $700,000 contract.

He would be re-signed by the Penguins to a one year, $1 million contract. He would score his first career NHL hat trick on January 2, 2022, in an 8–5 victory over the San Jose Sharks at PPG Paints Arena.

On September 12, 2022, Rodrigues as a free agent was signed to a one-year, $2 million deal with the defending Stanley Cup champion Colorado Avalanche.

Personal life
Evan married his wife, Christina, on July 15, 2017 whom he met while attending Boston University. Evan and Christina's first child, Grayson Michael, was born on October 28, 2018.

Career statistics

Regular season and playoffs

International

References

External links

1993 births
Living people
Boston University Terriers men's ice hockey players
Buffalo Sabres players
Canadian ice hockey left wingers
Canadian people of Portuguese descent
Colorado Avalanche players
Rochester Americans players
Pittsburgh Penguins players
Sportspeople from Etobicoke
Ice hockey people from Toronto
Undrafted National Hockey League players